Victor Ebubedike (born February 1, 1966), also known as Victor X Ebubedike and Victor Muhammad, is an English former American football player who played as a running back for London Ravens, from 1983-1990, then onto the NFL Europe's London Monarchs from 1991–1992 and 1995-1998.

Career statistics
http://www.footballdb.com/players/ebubevi01

References

1966 births
Living people
Sportspeople from London
English players of American football
London Monarchs players
Black British sportspeople